Wilhelmine Margaret Eve "Billa" Harrod  (née Cresswell, 1 December 1911 – 9 May 2005), was a British writer and architectural conservationist, best known for saving the mediaeval churches of Norwich, and the wife of the economist Sir Roy Harrod.

Early life
She was born Wilhelmine Margaret Eve Cresswell on 1 December 1911 at New Hunstanton, Snettisham, Norfolk, the daughter of Lieutenant (later Captain) Francis Joseph Cresswell (died 1914) of the Norfolk Regiment and his wife, Barbara Cresswell, née ffolkes (1884–1977). She was related to several Quaker gentry families, including the Gurneys.

Her father was killed in action at Mons not long after the beginning of the First World War, aged 31. Her mother remarried in 1918, General Sir Peter Strickland (1869–1951). She had a sister, Eve Dorothy Kathleen, known as Puffin, and they grew up in Egypt, where their stepfather was the Commander-in-Chief of British forces.

Career
From the 1930s, she lived between Norfolk and London, where she had a flat in Holborn with her sister Puffin and worked for the Georgian Group.

After marrying the economist Sir Roy Harrod in 1938, she moved to Oxford, where he was an academic, and where she became friends with John Betjeman (to whom she had been briefly engaged in the early 1930s) and his wife Penelope Chetwode, amongst others.

In 1957, Harrod and her co-writer Charles Linnel published the Shell Guide To Norfolk. As part of the process, she became aware of the poor condition of many of Norfolk's churches.

In 1970, 32 of Norwich's medieval churches were being considered for demolition, and with the help of Sir John Betjeman, she was able to save them, and then focused on rural churches in the county, becoming the founding chairman of the Norfolk Society Committee for Country Churches, which became the Norfolk Churches Trust, with Harrod as the founder, chairman and president.

She was appointed an OBE in 1992.

Personal life
She married Sir Roy Harrod in 1938. One of their sons was Dominick Harrod, economics correspondent for the BBC. She was widowed in 1978.

Later life
She died on 9 May 2005 at her home, the Old Rectory, Holt, Norfolk.

References

1911 births
2005 deaths
People from Holt, Norfolk
Architectural conservation